The  Orlando Predators season was the twenty-fifth and final season for the franchise in the Arena Football League. The team was coached by Rob Keefe and played their home games at the Amway Center.

Standings

Schedule

Regular season
The 2016 regular season schedule was released on December 10, 2015

Playoffs

Roster

References

Orlando Predators
Orlando Predators seasons
Orlando Predators
2010s in Orlando, Florida